The Nigerian National Assembly delegation from Kebbi State comprises three Senators and eight Representatives.

9th Assembly (2019–2023) 
The 9th National Assembly (2019–2023) was inaugurated on 11 June 2019, and is to end 2023. The All Progressives Congress won all the senate and House seats reserved for the Kebbi delegation.

8th Assembly (2015–2019)

The 8th National Assembly (2015–2019).
The All Progressive Congress (APC) won all the Senate.

Senators representing Kebbi State in the 8th Assembly were:

6th Assembly (2007–2011)

The 6th National Assembly (2007–2011) was inaugurated on 5 June 2007.
The People's Democratic Party (PDP) won all the Senate and House seats.

Senators representing Kebbi State in the 6th Assembly were:

Representatives in the 6th Assembly were:

See also
Senate of Nigeria
Nigerian National Assembly

References

Kebbi State
National Assembly (Nigeria) delegations by state